Romeo & Muna (Nepali:रोमियो एण्ड मुना) is a 2018 Nepalese comedy-drama film directed and written by Naresh Kumar Kc. Produced by Prasanna Man Gopali, Rosy Shrestha, Ram Sharma, and Kabin Shakya under the banner of V Motion Pictures, and  KS Productions. The film stars Vinay Shrestha and Shristi Shrestha in the lead roles alongside Prajwal Sujal Giri, Sushma Karki, and Surakshya Panta. The characters on the film are inspired by Devkota's Muna and Shakespeare's Romeo. The film is about a rich man named Romeo who meets a poor girl in Dharan named Muna, but will they be together.

Plot 
Ved (Vinay Shrestha), and Muna (Shristi Shrestha) are from different parts of the society one from the rich and one from the poor. Both of them meet in Dharan after meeting her both of their lives will change forever.

Cast 

 Vinay Shrestha as Ved
 Shristi Shrestha as Muna
 Surakshya Panta as Pirya
 Sushma Karki as Juile
 Menuka Pradhan as Dancer
 Prajwal Sujal Giri as Aaryan

Soundtrack

References

External links 

 

Nepalese comedy-drama films
2010s Nepali-language films
2018 films
2018 comedy-drama films
Films shot in Dharan